"Storm Warnings" is the tenth episode of the second season of the HBO original series The Wire. The episode was written by Ed Burns from a story by David Simon & Ed Burns and was directed by Rob Bailey. It originally aired on August 10, 2003.

Plot
Frank causes tensions in the stevedores union when he plans to run again for treasurer, despite an earlier agreement to let Ott take the position next. Ziggy and Johnny Fifty steal several cars from the docks, with plans to fence them to Glekas. When Ziggy tells Glekas the cars were put into containers, Glekas cuts Ziggy's share. Ziggy furiously demands more money, which Glekas laughs off until Ziggy racially abuses him. The ensuing argument escalates to the point where Ziggy impulsively takes a gun and shoots Glekas and a shop attendant. Glekas begs for his life but is killed. Ziggy breaks down at the scene as the police arrive. He is questioned by Landsman and signs a confession with little hesitation, only stopping beforehand to remorsefully request that Glekas' begging be included. When Aimee questions Nick about the sums of cash she has found hidden in his room, he tells her he is being paid off the books by the person who runs the warehouse he claims to work for. When they learn about Ziggy's shooting, Nick and Frank trade recriminations. Nick drowns his sorrows while drinking in a local park, where he is joined by his and Ziggy's childhood friend Prissy.

Valchek, annoyed that the detail has shifted focus away from Frank, calls in the FBI to take over the case. He hands them all the detail's information and requests their help in recovering his surveillance van. The Bureau agrees to share the case with Daniels and Pearlman on the condition that they focus attention on the union. Bunk accompanies McNulty on a fishing trip to disguise their surveillance. On the home front, Greggs is cold toward a now-pregnant Cheryl. Back at the detail, Greggs questions Beadie about balancing her police duties with being a mother. After the FBI agents offer to help trace the contraband containers' origins, Valchek arrives at the detail and lays into Daniels for failing to deliver a case on Frank. He insists Prez leave the detail, but Prez refuses to go and punches Valchek when he insults him. After an outraged Valchek leaves, Prez turns in his gun and submits himself to Daniels for a reprimand.

Koutris becomes aware of the FBI's investigation and divulges their tracking methods to The Greek. Vondas arranges for Eton to organize a meeting while insisting that phones be avoided. When Eton informs Vondas about Glekas' murder, he orders the warehouse to be cleaned out. Bunk and McNulty observe from a boat as Vondas and Eton discard their phones. Herc and Carver watch as Nick tries fruitlessly to see Vondas at The Greek's cafe. McNulty is disappointed when Fitz tells him that tracing text messages is impossible without knowing the service provider and the call's time and location. Fitz and Bunk trace a call using FBI technology and subpoena the billing information from the service provider. Bunk talks the phone company clerk into allowing them a peek at the records, and is dismayed to see messages are written in Greek. The detectives learn that Vondas has ordered the operation shut down. Greggs calls Beadie to invite her to participate in the raid, which she excitedly does. McNulty types warrants as Eton and Serge clean house.

The Barksdales see their trade improve after they begin their collaboration with Proposition Joe. Stringer gives Cheese control of three of the six Barksdale towers. Bodie quickly adapts to the new circumstances and becomes friendly competitors with Cheese. However, Brother Mouzone shows up and tells Cheese to leave if he doesn't work for Avon. After Cheese insults Mouzone, the hitman shoots him in the arm with a round of snake shot. Cheese is sufficiently intimidated and leaves. Joe knows of Mouzone's reputation and decides not to retaliate directly. Instead, he visits Butchie and convinces him to broker a meeting between Stringer and Omar. At the towers, Bodie and other dealers observe Mouzone and are impressed by his notoriety.

Production

Title reference
The title refers to the warnings sent out before a major weather event occurs, usually a thunderstorm. Metaphorically the title represents the episode's foreshadowing of approaching danger.

Epigraph

Ziggy makes this comment as a joke to his (union) accomplice as they steal cars from the docks.

Credits

Starring cast
Although credited, John Doman, and Wood Harris do not appear in this episode.

Guest stars
Seth Gilliam as Detective Ellis Carver
Domenick Lombardozzi as Detective Thomas "Herc" Hauk
Jim True-Frost as Detective Roland "Prez" Pryzbylewski
James Ransone as Ziggy Sobotka
Pablo Schreiber as Nick Sobotka
Method Man as Melvin "Cheese" Wagstaff
Melanie Nicholls-King as Cheryl
Michael Potts as Brother Mouzone
Bill Raymond as The Greek
Al Brown as Major Stanislaus Valchek
Robert F. Chew as Proposition Joe
Kristin Proctor as Aimee
Merritt Wever as Prissy
Benay Berger as FBI Supervisor Amanda Reese
Toni Lewis as Assistant United States Attorney Nadiva Bryant
Tom Mardirosian as Agent Koutris
Delaney Williams as Sergeant Jay Landsman
Teddy Cañez as George "Double G" Glekas
Jeffrey Fugitt as Officer Claude Diggins
Lev Gorens as Eton Ben-Eleazer
Charley Scalies as Thomas "Horseface" Pakusa
J.D. Williams as Preston "Boadie" Broadus
Chris Ashworth as Sergei Malatov
Kevin McKelvy as FBI Agent
S. Robert Morgan as Butchie
Doug Olear as FBI Special Agent Terrance "Fitz" Fitzhugh
William L. Thomas as FBI Agent

Uncredited appearances
Michael K. Williams as Omar Little
De'Rodd Hearns as Puddin
Jeffrey Pratt Gordon as Johnny "Fifty" Spamanto
Richard Burton as Sean "Shamrock" McGinty
DeAndre McCullough as Lamar
Bus Howard as Ott
Tommy Hahn as FBI Special Agent Salmond
Wes Johnson as Security Supervisor

First appearances
Lamar: Mouzone's dim-witted assistant.  Lamar is played by DeAndre McCulloch, one of the people David Simon wrote about in The Corner: A Year in the Life of an Inner-City Neighborhood.
Prissy:  a friend of Nick, former girlfriend of Ziggy. Previously mentioned in "Backwash"

References

External links
"Storm Warnings" at HBO.com

The Wire (season 2) episodes
2003 American television episodes